The Royal Pharmaceutical Society (RPharmS or RPS) is the body responsible for the leadership and support of the pharmacy profession (pharmacists) within England, Scotland, and Wales. It was created along with the General Pharmaceutical Council (GPhC) in September 2010 when the previous Royal Pharmaceutical Society of Great Britain was split so that representative and regulatory functions of the pharmacy profession could be separated. Membership in the society is not a prerequisite for engaging in practice as a pharmacist within the United Kingdom. Its predecessor the Pharmaceutical Society of Great Britain was founded on 15 April 1841.

History
The Royal Pharmaceutical Society was founded on 15 April 1841 as the Pharmaceutical Society of Great Britain, and headquartered at 17 Bloomsbury Square, London. Among its founding members were Jacob Bell and William Allen. The Northern British (Scottish) branch began the same year with nine founders including William Flockhart and John Duncan. From 1843, it had a royal charter that identified its chief objectives as the advancement of chemistry and pharmacy, the promotion of a system of education for its practitioners, and the legal protection of its members. In return, the public would enjoy a service provided by qualified professionals.

Headquarters

The headquarters of the society are on East Smithfield Road, located near Whitechapel and St Katharine Docks in London, UK. From 1976 until 2015 the Royal Pharmaceutical Society's former headquarters was in Lambeth on Lambeth High Street, London, UK.

Membership 

The Society currently offers five categories of membership:
 Member: Full membership is available to anyone who has ever been registered as a pharmacist in Great Britain, whether or not currently registered with the GPhC.
 Fellow: Fellowship may be conferred by the Society’s Panel of Fellows on pharmacists who have been members of the Society for at least 12 years and who have been deemed to have made outstanding original contributions to the advancement of pharmaceutical knowledge or to have attained distinction in the science, practice, profession or history of pharmacy. 
 Associate: Associate membership is open to two categories of person: (a) those registered elsewhere in the world who have never been registered in Britain; (b) those who have a recognized degree in pharmacy but have not yet registered as a pharmacist in Britain, either because they are still undergoing their preregistration trainings or because they are not working in a field of practice that requires registration with the GPhC.
 Student: Student membership is available to anyone studying for a degree in pharmacy at any institute recognized by the Society (in Britain or overseas).
 Pharmaceutical Scientist: Pharmacist scientist membership is available to anyone with a degree (or equivalent) in a subject related to the pharmacy who has worked for at least two years in a recognized area of the pharmaceutical sciences.

President of the society

 2021 Claire Anderson 
 2019 Sandra Gidley
 2017 - 2019   Ash Soni
 2016 - 2017 Martin Astbury
 2014 - 2016   Ash Soni

Publishing 
The Society operates two divisions of RPS Publishing: 
 The Pharmaceutical Press publishes textbooks on a wide range of topics in pharmacy and pharmaceutical sciences including the British National Formulary, the British National Formulary for Children and Martindale: The complete drug reference.  Both BNFs are freely available at https://bnf.nice.org.uk/
 PJ Publications publishes the weekly professional journal The Pharmaceutical Journal and the monthly Clinical Pharmacist.

Royal Pharmaceutical Society Museum
The Royal Pharmaceutical Society of Great Britain had a museum collection since 1842, which continues to be managed by the RPS today at its offices in East Smithfield. The exhibits cover all aspects of British pharmacy history, and include:

Traditional dispensing equipment
Drug storage containers
Fine "Lambeth delftware" dating from the 17th and 18th centuries
Proprietary (brand name) medicines dating from the 18th century to the present day
Bronze mortars
Medical caricatures
A photo archive

Since 2002, the Royal Pharmaceutical Society has concentrated on developing the collection of historical and contemporary proprietary medicines.

The museum is open to visitors and admission is free. Guided tours are available if booked in advance. In 1983 the Royal Pharmaceutical Society of Great Britain donated over 10,000 historic specimens of materia medica, including crude drugs, herbarium sheets, and slides to the Royal Botanic Gardens, Kew. This material is now housed in the Economic Botany Collection (EBC) at Kew. The museum is a member of the London Museums of Health & Medicine.

National Pharmacy Boards
The three boards provide professional leadership and advocacy support for pharmacy practice in England, Scotland and Wales respectively.  The members of the boards are elected by the members of the society, but the members of the assembly are not. The members of the assembly are elected by members of the boards. The assembly is senior to the boards in terms of policy making.

See also
Pharmaceutical industry in the United Kingdom
List of pharmacy organizations in the United Kingdom
List of schools of pharmacy in the United Kingdom
British National Formulary
The Pharmacy Practice Research Trust

References

External links
Official Website
PJ Online Official Website
Universities to study medicine in nigeria
Pharmaceutical Press Official Website
Royal Pharmaceutical Society Museum

Medical and health organisations based in London
Medical museums in London
Organizations established in 2010
Pharmacy organisations in the United Kingdom
2010 establishments in the United Kingdom